"Hide and Seek" is the first single from Tracie Spencer's self-titled debut album. The single was released in December 1987 and was written by Lynn Davis.

Chart information
"Hide and Seek" did not chart onto the Billboard Hot 100, but did chart at number 32 on the R&B/Hip-Hop Singles & Tracks chart.

Music video
The music video for "Hide and Seek" features Spencer singing the song in an audition for some kind of competition.

Weekly charts

References

1988 debut singles
Tracie Spencer songs
1987 songs
Contemporary R&B ballads
Pop ballads
1980s ballads